"Adam Raised a Cain" is the second track from Bruce Springsteen's fourth album Darkness on the Edge of Town.

Composition and lyrics 

The song is notable for its hard rock sound and lyrics that use biblical images to explain the relationship between a father and son (symbolised as Adam and his son, Cain).

Springsteen calls this song "emotionally autobiographical." The bitter but loving relationship between the father and son is similar to Springsteen's with his own father, Douglas. Springsteen once said: "Our actual relationship was probably more complicated than how I presented it. Those songs were ways that I spoke to my father at the time, because he didn't speak and we didn't talk very much."

In the 2010 documentary The Promise: The Making of Darkness on the Edge of Town, sound mixer Chuck Plotkin described Springsteen's instructions for how the jarring assault of this song should sound next to the more melodic tunes on Darkness. Springsteen told Plotkin to think of a movie showing two lovers having a picnic, when the scene suddenly cuts to a dead body. This song, the singer explained, is that body.

Springsteen and the E Street Band released a longer version of the song on their 1986 live album Live/1975–85.

Use in the media 

The song was used in the film Baby It's You, directed by John Sayles, who would also direct Springsteen's video clips for "Born in the U.S.A.", "I'm on Fire" and "Glory Days".

The song was used in Season 7 during the opening scene of episode 13 "Papa's Goods," the series finale of Sons of Anarchy. The creator of Sons of Anarchy Kurt Sutter originally wanted to use the song as a cover in the final episode of Season 3, but there were issues with licensing from Sony and Springsteen did not like the idea of a cover of his song. An agreement was finally reached where the song would be played in its original version for the series finale.

Personnel
According to authors Philippe Margotin and Jean-Michel Guesdon:

Bruce Springsteen – vocals, guitars
Roy Bittan – piano
Clarence Clemons – percussion, backing vocals
Danny Federici – organ
Garry Tallent – bass
Steven Van Zandt – guitars, backing vocals
Max Weinberg – drums
The band – backing vocals

References

1978 songs
Bruce Springsteen songs
Song recordings produced by Jon Landau
Songs written by Bruce Springsteen
Song recordings produced by Bruce Springsteen